Macgregor Kilpatrick (July 30, 1916 – August 30, 1997) was an American ice hockey executive. He was an original owner of the New Haven Nighthawks of the American Hockey League (AHL). He also served as senior vice president and general counsel for the AHL.

Raised in Ardsley, New York, Kilpatrick attended the United States Naval Academy where he was an All-American soccer player. During World War II he served as a fighter pilot in the Pacific and was awarded the Navy Cross and the Distinguished Flying Cross for his valor and heroism in combat. He received a promotion to commander when he retired from active duty in June 1947.

After returning from the war, he earned a law degree from Yale Law School and practiced law in Branford, Connecticut, forming the firm of Kilpatrick, Kahl and Josephson with other former Navy officers.

In 1970 he was approved as an owner of the expansion team, the New Haven Nighthawks, which began play with the 1972–73 AHL season.

He was selected to receive the 1975–76 James C. Hendy Memorial Award, as the executive who made the most outstanding contribution to the AHL.

In the summer of 1997, the American Hockey League created the Macgregor Kilpatrick Trophy, which is presented annually to the AHL team that finishes the regular season with the most points.

Macgregor Kilpatrick died on August 30, 1997.

In 2010, Kilpatrick was posthumously inducted into the American Hockey League Hall of Fame.

References

1916 births
1997 deaths
People from Ardsley, New York
United States Naval Academy alumni
United States Naval Aviators
Recipients of the Distinguished Flying Cross (United States)
Recipients of the Navy Cross (United States)
Yale Law School alumni
New Haven Nighthawks